DXKS (1080 AM) Radyo Ronda is a radio station owned and operated by the Radio Philippines Network. Its studio is located along Borromeo St., Brgy. Taft, Surigao City and its transmitter is located along Brgy. Cagniog, Surigao City.

References

Radio stations in Surigao del Norte
Radio stations established in 1962
News and talk radio stations in the Philippines